The Exposed Upper Jurassic deposits near the village of Gorodischi, Ulyanovsk Oblast  on the right bank of Kuybyshev Reservoir is one  of the protected areas of Ulyanovsk Oblast.

The Gorodishchi exposure is within the Ulyanovsk paleontology zakaznik. It is scientifically valuable as a basal section Upper Jurassic adjournment on Russian Platform. Many fossils have been recovered from it, including vertebrae of ichthyosaurs and plesiosaurs, and mollusc shells. The Cambrian deposits are partially covered by a landslip, and they are below the level of the Kuybyshev Reservoir.

The deposits provide an easy access to Jurassic and Cretaceous fossils. The layers consistently leaning against each other contain valuable information about evolution between the two geological periods: Jurassic and Cretaceous.

References

Geology of European Russia
Geography of Ulyanovsk Oblast
Jurassic Russia
Jurassic paleontological sites
Mesozoic paleontological sites of Europe
Paleontology in Russia